Wanborough is a large village and civil parish in the borough of Swindon, Wiltshire, England. The settlement along the High Street is Lower Wanborough, while Upper Wanborough is on higher ground to the southwest. The parish includes the hamlets of Horpit (a short distance north of Wanborough) and Foxhill,  to the southeast.

History
There was a Roman settlement, Durocornovium, slightly northwest of the current village, at a road junction mentioned in the Antonine Itinerary. Being the last vicus on Ermin Way or Ermin Street before the scarp slope of the Marlborough Downs, Durocornovium was a site where horses were watered before the steep climb off the Oxfordshire plain. Wanborough is just off the Ridgeway National Trail. Development in a strip along the road frontages characterised the village, which reached maximum development in the 4th century.

Wanborough has been suggested as the site of the fortress of Guinnion, the eighth of the twelve battles of Arthur listed by Nennius in Historia Brittonum

In three charters of the ninth century Wanborough is recorded as Wenbeorg. In the Domesday Book it is Wemberge, the 'm' being an evident mistake for 'n'.

The Anglo-Saxon Chronicle records that a battle was fought in 592 AD between Ceawlin, King of Wessex and the Britons, at a place called Woddesbeorge or Wodnesbeorge, ("Woden's borough"). This has given rise to considerable speculation as to whether the battle took place at Wanborough in Wessex, or in Staffordshire at Wednesbury (Wodnesbeorge, or "Woden's borough").

The antiquarian and historian W. H. Duignan stated in 1902: "Now it is impossible it can be Wanborough [...] 'Wen' [in Wenbeorg], in the ninth century, could not represent an original Woden. There is only one Wednesbury in England[...]and I suggest that the Woddesbeorge of three versions of the Chronicle is an error for Wodnesbeorge." Modern place-name scholarship tends to agree that the battle took place at Wednesbury. The alternative view is that the battle took place at Adam's Grave near Alton Barnes.

Parish church

The Church of England parish church of Saint Andrew is unusual in having a spire at one end and a tower at the other. There are only three parish churches with this feature in the UK. The others are at nearby Purton and at Ormskirk, Lancashire.

Amenities
The village has a primary school but no shops.  The village has five public houses: The Brewers Arms; The New Calley Arms; The Cross Keys; The Harrow; and The Plough. There was a sixth pub called The Black Horse which closed in 2012.

Foxhill had one public house, The Shepherd's Rest, which has re-opened as a restaurant serving Indian cuisine and renamed "The Burj".

There is a monthly farmers' market in the village hall on the third Saturday of every month, except August where is replaced by the Wanborough Show.

King Edward's Place

Wanborough is the site of King Edward's Place, a country house once used as a private retreat for King Edward VII and his mistress Lillie Langtry.

It was also the home of James "Jimmy" White (1877 – 1927), a financier, property developer, racehorse owner and speculator who committed suicide at the house by taking Prussic acid.

It continued as a racehorse stud, before becoming the main training centre for Swindon-based Allied Dunbar life assurance, subsequently taken over by Zurich Insurance Group, who built a large modern conference centre adjacent to the older house.

When Zurich discontinued having a direct sales force, the site became the De Vere Liddington hotel in 2008, before becoming insolvent in 2009 and being sold to PGL who operate the site as PGL Liddington, an activity centre for children.

References

External links

Civil parishes in Wiltshire
Villages in Wiltshire
Borough of Swindon